John Troup Shewmake (January 23, 1828 – December 1, 1898) was a lawyer and Confederate politician during the American Civil War.

Shewmake was born in Burke County, Georgia, and served in the Georgia State Senate in 1861 and again in 1879. He represented Georgia in the Second Confederate Congress from 1864 to 1865.

References
Political Graveyard

1828 births
1898 deaths
Georgia (U.S. state) state senators
Members of the Confederate House of Representatives from Georgia (U.S. state)
19th-century American politicians